Maria Mokhova (born August 11, 2006) is an American pair skater. With her brother and skating partner, Ivan Mokhov, she placed fourth at the 2022 Skate America.

On the junior level, Mokhova/Mokhov are the 2019 U.S. junior national pewter medalists.

Personal life 
Mokhova was born on August 11, 2006, in Lansing, Michigan to parents Andrei Mokhov and Oksana Yakusheva, both former professional figure skaters originally from the Soviet Union. She is the middle child between two brothers, Ivan and Mikhail. Mokhova is bilingual, speaking both English and Russian. As of 2022, she attends high school online through Michigan Connections Academy.

Programs

With Mokhov

Competitive highlights 
GP: Grand Prix; CS: ISU Challenger Series; JGP: Junior Grand Prix

With Mokhov

References

External links 

 

2006 births
Living people
American female pair skaters
People from Mason, Michigan
Sportspeople from Lansing, Michigan
American people of Russian descent